Spiralisigna minutissima is a moth in the family Geometridae first described by Charles Swinhoe in 1902. It is found on Sumbawa, Bali, Peninsular Malaysia, Borneo and the Philippines.

The larvae feed on Flacourtia species.

References

Moths described in 1902
Eupitheciini